Bantama is suburb of Kumasi. Kumasi is the regional capital of the Ashanti Region of Ghana.  Bantama is both a residential and commercial area in the Kumasi Metropolitan Assembly. It is in the centre of the regional capital.

History

Notable places

 Komfo Anokye Teaching Hospital and Nursing Training School.
 Komfo Anokye Sword Museum.
 The Bantama Market Square.

References

Populated places in Kumasi Metropolitan Assembly